Antonín Kramerius (10 July 1939 – 15 January 2019) was a Czechoslovak footballer. He competed in the men's tournament at the 1968 Summer Olympics. At club level, Kramerius played for Sparta Prague and Spartak Hradec Králové. He won two caps for the Czechoslovakia national football team.

Honours
Sparta Prague
 Czechoslovak First League (2): 1964–65, 1966–67
 Czechoslovak Cup (2): 1963–64, 1971–72
 Mitropa Cup: 1964

References

External links
 

1939 births
2019 deaths
Czech footballers
Czechoslovak footballers
Czechoslovakia international footballers
Olympic footballers of Czechoslovakia
Footballers at the 1968 Summer Olympics
Sportspeople from Olomouc
Association football goalkeepers
AC Sparta Prague players
FC Hradec Králové players
Czechoslovak First League players
SK Sigma Olomouc players
Křídla vlasti Olomouc players